Eric Demetric Dickerson (born September 2, 1960) is an American former professional football player who was a running back in the National Football League (NFL) for 11 seasons. Dickerson played college football for the Mustangs of Southern Methodist University and was recognized as an All-American. He was selected in the first round of the 1983 NFL Draft and played professionally for the Los Angeles Rams, Indianapolis Colts, Los Angeles Raiders, and Atlanta Falcons of the NFL. During his NFL career, he rushed for over 13,000 yards. He holds the NFL's single-season rushing record with 2,105 yards, set in 1984. Dickerson was inducted into the Pro Football Hall of Fame in 1999 and, in 2019, was named to the NFL 100th Anniversary All-Time Team. He is widely regarded as one of the greatest running backs of all time. He wore prescription goggles throughout his career due to myopia.

College career
Dickerson committed to Texas A&M before reconsidering and deciding amongst Oklahoma, Southern California and Southern Methodist University (SMU). His great-great aunt talked him into staying in the state of Texas to attend Southern Methodist University because she liked SMU coach Ron Meyer. Dickerson was the subject of recruiting controversy when he started driving a new Pontiac Trans-Am during his senior year of high school. According to "myth," Dickerson began driving a new Pontiac Trans-Am automobile about the same time he committed to A&M, and, when he signed with SMU, he suddenly was not driving the Trans-Am because it had been destroyed by a vengeful Aggie". Ron Meyer famously called the car, the "Trans A&M." At the time he said his grandmother from Mexico bought it for him. Dickerson still refuses to answer on whether or not he accepted anything to attend SMU, saying, "Even if I did take something, I still wouldn't tell."

Initially, Dickerson shared carries with Craig James and Charles Waggoner, all three blue-chip recruits in 1979. Waggoner was hurt returning a kickoff their freshman season, leaving Dickerson and James to lead SMU's running attack, called the Pony Express. Dickerson gained 4,450 yards on 790 carries to break Earl Campbell’s Southwest Conference record for yards and attempts. His 48 career touchdowns tied Doak Walker’s SMU total for career scoring. In his senior year, despite splitting time with James, Dickerson finished third in the Heisman Trophy voting, behind Herschel Walker and John Elway. He was also a first-team All-American in 1982 and a second-team All-American in 1981.

Statistics

Professional career

1983–1987: L.A. Rams

While he considered going to the Los Angeles Express in the United States Football League, Dickerson decided to go into the National Football League. He was selected second overall in the 1983 NFL Draft by the Los Angeles Rams. An immediate success, he established rookie records for most rushing attempts (390), most rushing yards gained (1,808) and most touchdowns rushing (18), including another two receiving touchdowns. His efforts earned him All-Pro, Pro Bowl, Player of the Year and Rookie of the Year honors.

In his second season, Dickerson continued his onslaught on the NFL record book becoming a member of the 2,000-yard club. Twelve times in 1984 he gained more than 100 yards rushing, breaking the record of 100-yard games in a season held by O. J. Simpson. His 2,105 total yards rushing beat Simpson's 1973 NFL season record of 2,003 yards (Dickerson having reached 2,007 yards after 15 games), but since the NFL expanded the regular season from 14 to 16 games in 1978, Dickerson had the benefit of playing in two additional games. No one has since rushed for more yards in a single NFL season. Dickerson's 5.6 yards per carry led the Rams to a playoff berth in 1984.

Although he rushed for 1,234 yards in 1985 while missing the first two games while in a contract dispute, he missed the Pro Bowl for the first time in his young NFL career. He did go on to rush for a playoff record 248 yards against the Dallas Cowboys in post-season play.

1987–1991: Indianapolis Colts

The 1985 season marked the beginning of ongoing contract disputes between Dickerson and the Rams. In 1987, after playing just three games for the Rams during the strike-shortened 1987 season, Dickerson was traded to the Indianapolis Colts in one of the NFL's biggest trades ever at that time. In a three-team deal, the Colts traded linebacker Cornelius Bennett, whom they drafted but were unable to sign to a contract, to the Buffalo Bills for their first-round pick in 1988, first- and second-round picks in 1989, and running back Greg Bell. The Colts in turn traded Bell and the three draft choices from Buffalo plus their own first- and second-round picks in 1988, their second-round pick in 1989, and running back Owen Gill to the Rams for Dickerson. With the picks the Rams took running back Gaston Green, wide receiver Aaron Cox, linebacker Fred Strickland, running back Cleveland Gary, linebacker Frank Stams, and defensive back Darryl Henley. The trade reunited Dickerson with Ron Meyer, who had left SMU after Dickerson's junior season to take the head coaching position in New England and who was hired by the Colts in 1986 following Rod Dowhower's firing.

Although he played in just nine games with the Colts that year, he still managed to gain 1,011 yards to finish the season with 1,288. Also, he spearheaded a late season Colts run that helped the team to their first winning season (and first playoff berth) in 10 years.

In 1988, Dickerson, with 1,659 yards rushing, became the first Colt to lead the league in rushing since Alan Ameche in 1955. This would mark the apogee of Dickerson's career with the Colts (although he would gain 1,311 yards rushing in 1989). Also, 1989 was the year that he passed the 10,000-yard mark, becoming the fastest player ever to do so (91 games), accomplishing the feat faster than greats like Jim Brown (98 games), Barry Sanders (103 games), Emmitt Smith (106 games), and LaDainian Tomlinson (106 games). By 1989, he had set a new NFL record with seven straight seasons of more than 1,000 yards rushing, and led the league for four of those seasons. With the retirement of Tony Dorsett at the end of 1988, he became the leader among active players in career rushing yards, a position he occupied until his own retirement in 1993.

However, injuries, further contract disputes, and suspensions clouded his final two seasons with the Colts. Dickerson, at 29, was the highest-paid running back in the NFL, receiving an annual reported salary of $1.4 million. Following prolonged contract disputes, the fed-up Colts placed him on the inactive list before the start of the 1990 season where he stayed for 7 weeks and lost more than $600,000 in salary. In his sixth game back from suspension, he rushed for 143 yards against the Bengals on 22 carries—this effort lifted him past Jim Brown to third place on the NFL career rushing list behind Walter Payton and Tony Dorsett. He was again suspended in November 1991, and amidst injuries and age, managed to run for only 536 yards that season. The Colts finished the year bottoming out with a 1–15 record.

Dickerson has described the trade to Indianapolis as the worst moment of his career, and stated that he disliked his time with the Colts.

1992–1993: Final years
On April 26, 1992, Dickerson was traded by the Colts to the Los Angeles Raiders for their fourth- and eighth-round picks in the 1992 draft. There were occasional flashes of greatness—107 yards against the Broncos, 103 against the Chargers, where he recorded his 63rd and 64th career 100-yard games—but those would be his last. Dickerson also scored on a 40-yard touchdown run, reminiscent of his prime, in front of a nationally televised Monday Night audience in a game against Kansas City. That year, he led the team in rushing attempts and yards. However, he suffered from splitting carries with Marcus Allen by having the latter finish the second half.

The following season, Dickerson was traded to the Atlanta Falcons on July 7, 1993, for a sixth-round draft pick. He played in a backup role, making his final national televised appearance during the Monday Night Football game on September 27, 1993, when the Falcons hosted the Pittsburgh Steelers in a losing effort. The Falcons traded Dickerson and third-year cornerback Bruce Pickens to the Green Bay Packers for running back John Stephens on October 13, 1993.

The trade came a week after Dickerson said he had been told that the Falcons were waiving him because Coach Jerry Glanville wanted to use younger players. The next day, Falcons officials said that there had been a misunderstanding and that Dickerson had not been placed on waivers. Dickerson retired as the second leading rusher of all time after failing a physical with the Packers.

On August 29, 2017, Dickerson signed a one-day contract to officially retire as a member of the Los Angeles Rams.

NFL career statistics

Regular season

Honors

Dickerson became the seventh back to gain more than 10,000 yards and the fastest ever to do so, reaching the milestone in just 91 games. During his 11-year career, Dickerson gained 13,259 yards rushing, which was second all-time at the time of his retirement, and rushed for 90 touchdowns. He gained another 2,137 yards and 6 touchdowns on 281 pass receptions. A six-time Pro Bowl selection, Dickerson was All-Pro in 1983, 1984, 1986, 1987 and 1988. In 1999, his first year of eligibility, Eric Dickerson was selected to become a member of the Pro Football Hall of Fame. Also in 1999, he was ranked number 38 on The Sporting News''' list of the 100 Greatest Football Players. The following year, he provided on-field commentary during Monday Night Football broadcasts.

The Rams' number 29 has been retired in his honor.

Dickerson was inducted into the Indianapolis Colts Ring of Honor during the week 15 game against the Houston Texans on December 15, 2013, along with Marshall Faulk, another former Colts running back, who, coincidentally, also played for the Rams-albeit in St Louis.

In 1999, he was elected to the Pro Football Hall of Fame.

In 2019, he was one of twelve running backs selected to the NFL 100th Anniversary All-Time Team.

Dickerson was elected to the College Football Hall of Fame in 2020.

Post-NFL career
Along with Melissa Stark, Dickerson served as a sideline reporter on Monday Night Football broadcasts for ABC during the 2000 and 2001 NFL seasons.

During the 2007 football season and 2016 football season, Dickerson worked as a broadcaster for KCBS television in Los Angeles, providing commentary for NFL pregame and postgame shows.

He started a sports memorabilia company called Original Mini Jerseys with former Los Angeles Rams teammate LeRoy Irvin. The company received their NFL license in 2006 and sells authentic miniature replica jerseys. He also owns an internet-based sporting goods company, E Champs.

Dickerson made a cameo appearance in the television series Hawaii Five-0 in 2014. In August 2016, he began hosting a two-hour Monday afternoon program on Los Angeles sports-talk station KLAC.

In 2017, he competed in the reality television game show The New Celebrity Apprentice. He was the third contestant "terminated" by host Arnold Schwarzenegger.

In 2019, Dickerson played a role as LAFD Chief Brinkle in the TV Series S.W.A.T.''.

In 2017, he joined Fox Sports' FS1 as an NFL analyst.

See also
 List of National Football League rushing yards leaders
 List of National Football League rushing champions

References

External links

 
 
 
 

1960 births
Living people
African-American players of American football
All-American college football players
American Conference Pro Bowl players
American football running backs
Atlanta Falcons players
College Football Hall of Fame inductees
Indianapolis Colts players
Legends Football League coaches
Los Angeles Raiders players
Los Angeles Rams players
National Conference Pro Bowl players
National Football League announcers
National Football League Offensive Rookie of the Year Award winners
People from Sealy, Texas
Players of American football from Texas
Pro Football Hall of Fame inductees
SMU Mustangs football players
Participants in American reality television series
The Apprentice (franchise) contestants
American adoptees
21st-century African-American people
20th-century African-American sportspeople
National Football League Offensive Player of the Year Award winners
National Football League players with retired numbers